Diuris unica is a species of orchid which is endemic to eastern Australia. It usually has only one grass-like leaf at its base and up to eight bright, lemon-yellow flowers with a few dark markings. It is similar to D. chrysantha but flowers much earlier than that species and has only a single leaf rather than two.

Description
The flowers are bright lemon-yellow with a few dark markings at the base of the dorsal sepal and labellum. Flowering occurs from July to September.

Taxonomy and naming
Diuris unica was first formally described in 2006 by David Jones from a specimen he collected near Maryborough in 1986. The specific epithet (unica) is a Latin word meaning "only", "sole" or "singular", referring to the single leaf of this orchid.

Distribution and habitat
This orchid grows in wallum and sandy heath in coastal and near-coastal districts in south-eastern Queensland and disjunctly in northern New South Wales.

References

Orchids of New South Wales
Orchids of Queensland
Endemic orchids of Australia
protena
Plants described in 2006